Kipchoge Hezekiah Keino (born 17 January 1940) is a retired Kenyan track and field athlete. He was the chairman of the Kenyan Olympic Committee (KOC) until 29 September 2017. A two-time Olympic gold medalist, Keino was among the first in a long line of successful middle and long distance runners to come from the country and has helped and inspired many of his fellow countrymen and women to become the athletics force that they are today. In 2000, he became an honorary  member of the International Olympic Committee (IOC). In 2012, he was one of 24 athletes inducted as inaugural members of the IAAF Hall of Fame.

Early life
Keino was born in Kipsamo, Nandi District, Kenya. His name, Kipchoge, is a Nandi language expression for "born near the grain storage shed". His parents died when he was a youngster and he was raised by an aunt. After finishing school, he joined the Kenya Police. Before taking up athletics, he played rugby.

Athletic career
He began his international career at the 1962 Commonwealth Games in Perth, Western Australia where he came eleventh in the three miles. At the 1964 Summer Olympics he finished fifth in 5000 m and just missed qualification for the 1500 m final.

On 27 August 1965, Keino lowered the 3000 m world record by over 6 seconds to 7:39.6 in his first attempt at the distance. He won two gold medals (1500 and 5000 metres) at the inaugural All-Africa Games. Later in that year, he broke the 5000 m world record held by Ron Clarke, clocking 13:24.2. At the 1966 Commonwealth Games in Kingston, Jamaica, he won both the mile run and three-mile run. In the next Commonwealth Games, Keino won the 1500 metres and was third in the 5000 metres.

At the 1968 Summer Olympics in Mexico City, he won the 1500 metres gold medal (defeating American favourite and world record holder Jim Ryun by 20 metres, the largest winning margin in the history of the event) and 5000 m silver medal. Four years later, he won the 3000 metres steeplechase gold and 1500 metres silver at the 1972 Summer Olympics in Munich, Germany. He retired in 1973. He is on the cover of the October 1968 issue of Track and Field News, the first issue following the Olympics. He shared the cover of the September 1969 issue with Naftali Bon.

After athletics
 With his wife, Phyllis Keino, he has dedicated significant efforts to humanitarian work in Eldoret, Kenya. They have established the Lewa Children's Home for orphans, the KipKeino Primary School in 1999, and the Kip Keino Secondary School in 2009.
 For his work with orphans, he shared Sports Illustrated magazine's "Sportsmen and Sportswomen of the Year" award in 1987 with seven others, characterized as "Athletes Who Care". In 1996, Kipchoge Keino Stadium in Eldoret was named after him.
 In 2007, he was made an honorary Doctor of Law by the University of Bristol. Earlier, Egerton University in Nakuru had awarded him an honorary degree. In July 2012, he received further recognition from the City of Bristol after the Kenyan Olympic Committee, under his presidency, made Bristol the training base for its athletes in preparation for the London 2012 Olympics. In 2012, Kipchoge Keino was among the inductees in the IAAF Hall of fame. The Bristol City Council awarded him freedom of the city, making him the first to receive this honour from Bristol since Sir Winston Churchill
 On 5 August 2016, at the Olympic opening ceremony in Rio de Janeiro, Brazil, Keino was awarded the first Olympic Laurel, for outstanding service to the Olympic movement.

Personal life
Keino resides on a farm in Eldoret, Kenya where he controls and runs a charitable organization for orphans. He is married to Phyllis Keino. Their son Martin was a two-time NCAA champion and highly successful pace-setter.

See also

References

External links
 https://kipkeinofoundation.org/
 Beijing 2008 dazzles, as we 'flashback' to the 1968 Mexico City Olympics and a triumphant Kipchoge Keino, Posted On: 2008-08-08.
 

 
 

 
 

1940 births
Living people
People from Nandi County
Kenyan male long-distance runners
Kenyan male middle-distance runners
Kenyan male steeplechase runners
International Olympic Committee members
Olympic athletes of Kenya
Athletes (track and field) at the 1964 Summer Olympics
Athletes (track and field) at the 1968 Summer Olympics
Athletes (track and field) at the 1972 Summer Olympics
Olympic gold medalists for Kenya
Olympic silver medalists for Kenya
Laureus World Sports Awards winners
Commonwealth Games gold medallists for Kenya
Commonwealth Games bronze medallists for Kenya
Commonwealth Games medallists in athletics
Athletes (track and field) at the 1962 British Empire and Commonwealth Games
Athletes (track and field) at the 1966 British Empire and Commonwealth Games
Athletes (track and field) at the 1970 British Commonwealth Games
Recipients of the Olympic Order
Medalists at the 1972 Summer Olympics
Medalists at the 1968 Summer Olympics
Olympic gold medalists in athletics (track and field)
Olympic silver medalists in athletics (track and field)
African Games gold medalists for Kenya
African Games medalists in athletics (track and field)
Athletes (track and field) at the 1965 All-Africa Games
Humanitarians
20th-century Kenyan people
21st-century Kenyan people
Medallists at the 1966 British Empire and Commonwealth Games
Medallists at the 1970 British Commonwealth Games